Bobo is the given name of:

 Saint Bobo (died 985), French Chalcedonian saint and knight
 Bobo of San Teodoro (died 1199), Italian cardinal
 Bobo Bola (born 1985), Rwandan footballer
 Bobo Chan (born 1979), Hong Kong former singer and model

See also
 Bobo (nickname)